The Congress Plaza Hotel is located on South Michigan Avenue across from Grant Park in Chicago at 520 South Michigan Avenue. Its eleven story edifice was originally designed by architect Clinton J. Warren as an annex to the Auditorium Theater across the street. The two buildings were linked by a marble-lined underground passage called Peacock Alley. The design and construction of these two additions were overseen by the firm of Holabird & Roche. The hotel now features 871 guest rooms and suites.

Through the 1930s the hotel was run by hotel industry pioneer Ralph Hitz's National Hotel Management Company. At this same time, part of the hotel was used as the location for a Benny Goodman NBC Radio Show.  Following the outbreak of World War II, the Government purchased the Congress Hotel and used it as a training school for  U.S. Army Air Forces.

It reopened for civilian use in time for the summer political conventions of 1944. At this time, John J. Mack was president of the Michigan-Congress Hotel Corporation.

In 1950, the Pick Hotel Corporation bought the hotel and oversaw a major renovation of the entire hotel, which included new suites and restaurants.

Another modernization project began in the 1960s, which added a ballroom and escalators.

The hotel is not currently affiliated with any national chain. It has been owned by a group of investors led by Albert Nasser of Tel-Aviv, Israel, since 1987.

The hotel is frequently noted as one of the most haunted buildings in Chicago. In particular, room 1252 was said to be the haunted by Czech-Jewish refugee Adele Langer and her two sons Jan Misha and Karel Tommy. Depressed by the disappearance of her husband, Langer reportedly threw her sons out of the window before leaping out of the room and falling twelve stories to her death.

Hosting Presidents and Major Events

Over the years the Congress has welcomed many presidents as well as hosted major events.

Presidents who have stayed at or visited the Congress include Grover Cleveland, William McKinley, Teddy Roosevelt, William Howard Taft, Woodrow Wilson, Warren Harding, Calvin Coolidge, and Franklin Roosevelt.

In June, 1912, Theodore Roosevelt stayed at the Congress Plaza when the 1912 Republican National Convention was held in Chicago. Roosevelt, who at that time was seeking the Republican nomination for President, spoke from the balcony of his room at the hotel to a crowd assembled across the street in Grant Park.

In October 1916, US President Woodrow Wilson passed the hotel as part of his visit to the city. Over a hundred protestors from the National Women's Party demonstrated in favor of women's suffrage with a silent protest. Holding banners such as "Wilson is Against Women," the demonstrators were attacked by a mob and their banners destroyed while police looked on and, in some cases, laughed, according to newspaper reports.

Events that have been held at the hotel include the 1963 Prohibition Party National Convention on August 23, 1963.

Strike

On 15 June 2003, about 130 members of UNITE HERE Local 1 went on strike to protest a proposed seven percent wage cut. On 16 June 2007, Barack Obama, then running for the presidency, briefly stood by the picket line and promised to return as president, but he did not. The strike, one of the world's longest, ended May 30, 2013 after nearly 10 years. No concessions were given by management.

Murals

Taos Society of Artists painter, E. Martin Hennings painted the ceiling murals inside the Florentine Room around 1918.

In 1940, Louis Grell (1887–1960), a Chicago-based artist, was commissioned to paint thirteen murals for the lunettes that are an architectural feature surrounding the grand lobby.  The murals were various popular scenes around Chicago at the time.  Under the Albert Pick Jr ownership in 1952, Grell was again commissioned to paint the same architectural lunettes, this time Grell incorporated Chicago figures into the scenes depicting important trades significant to Chicago's growth and symbolism.  Lady Liberty was found in one mural holding the Chicago River "Y" on her lap.  Additionally, in 1955 Pick commissioned Grell once again, during one of the many renovations, to paint three walls for the newly decorated Pompeian Room which also had a magnificent Louis Comfort Tiffany glass fountain in the center of the vast room.  Today glass covers the thirteen lunettes where the murals could be hiding.  Grell also painted a large white Peacock that was mounted above the bar next to Peacock Alley.  Each wall had a main central Greek/Roman mural, however, Grell decorated the entire wall with various patterns of flora and custom design.

References

External links
 
 Union’s strike web site
 Louis Grell Foundation

1893 establishments in Illinois
Hotels established in 1893
Hotels in Chicago